St. Louis Riot may refer to
The Camp Jackson Affair in St. Louis, Missouri in 1861
The East St. Louis Riot in East St. Louis, Illinois in 1917
The 2017 St. Louis protests